New Brunswick Hungarian Americans was an American soccer club based in New Brunswick, New Jersey that was a member of the American Soccer League.

For the 1967/68 season, the club was simply known as New Brunswick Hungarian.

Year-by-year

American Soccer League (1933–1983) teams
Defunct soccer clubs in New Jersey
Hungarian-American culture in New Jersey
New Brunswick, New Jersey